Allen Fisher was a former Australian professional soccer player who played as a right-back for Sydney clubs and the Australia national soccer team. Fisher had the first captaincy for an unofficial international match for Australia against Wanganui in May 1922.

Club career
Fisher played with Balmain Fernleigh from 1919 to 1921, winning two premiership titles, then transferred to Pyrmont to play in the 1922 Sydney Metropolitan league. He joined second-tier club Callan Park Asylum in 1923 and finished his club career late in 1924 with Sydney.

International career
Fisher played Australia's historic tour in 1922 where he played three international matches for Australia in 1922 all against New Zealand. He captained Australia in their 1922 non-A international tour in New Zealand. After the non-A tour in New Zealand, he moved to vice-captain for the official team and gave the captaincy to Alex Gibb.

Career statistics

International

References

Year of birth missing
Year of death missing
Australian soccer players
Association football defenders
Australia international soccer players